Antonio Fayenz (2 November 1899 – 16 August 1980) was an Italian footballer who played as a midfielder. On 22 March 1925, he represented the Italy national football team on the occasion of a friendly match against France in a 7–0 home win. He was also part of Italy's squad for the 1924 Summer Olympics, but he did not play in any matches.

References

1899 births
1980 deaths
Italian footballers
Italy international footballers
Association football midfielders
Calcio Padova players